The southern leatherside chub (Lepidomeda aliciae) is a species of freshwater ray-finned fish from the family Cyprinidae, the carps and minnows. It is endemic to Utah in the United States. It is found in slow-flowing pools and backwaters, usually over substrates consisting of mud or sand, of creeks and small to medium-sized rivers.  Within Utah, this species is found on the southeastern margins of the Bonneville Basin; it has been recorded from the American Fork, Provo River, and Spanish Fork drainages of the Utah Lake Basin and the San Pitch River, East Fork Sevier River, Beaver River, and the lower, middle, and upper Sevier River drainages of the Sevier River Basin; it has now apparently been extirpated from the Provo River at Utah Lake and from the Beaver River. It is threatened by the fragmentation of its habitat caused by water abstraction for irrigation, damming, urbanization, and poor farming practices. It is also threatened by introduced predatory fish such as the brown trout (Salmo trutta).

References

Fish described in 1881
 

Freshwater fish of North America